For the Swiss-American Abstract Expressionist artist, see Hans Burkhardt.

Hans O. Burchardt (February 9, 1904 – September 8, 1992) was an American woodcarver who designed animals. His work can be seen at the Museum of Nebraska Art.

References

1904 births
1992 deaths
German emigrants to the United States
Artists from Lincoln, Nebraska
American woodcarvers
Place of birth missing
20th-century American artists